Malik Abdul Gafar Dogar (born 1 January 1964) is a Pakistani politician who had been a member of the National Assembly of Pakistan, from June 2013 to May 2018.

Early life
He was born on 1 January 1964.

Political career

He ran for the seat of the National Assembly of Pakistan as a candidate of Pakistan Muslim League (N) (PML-N) from Constituency NA-148 (Multan-I) in by-election held in 2012, but was unsuccessful. He received 42,819 votes and lost the seat to Syed Ali Musa Gillani.

He was elected to the National Assembly as a candidate of PML-N from Constituency NA-148 (Multan-I) in 2013 Pakistani general election. He received 81,830 votes and defeated Shah Mehmood Qureshi. In October 2017, he was appointed as Federal Parliamentary Secretary for science and technology.

References

Living people
Pakistan Muslim League (N) politicians
Punjabi people
Pakistani MNAs 2013–2018
1964 births